The Treaty of Fontainebleau was a secret agreement signed on 27 October 1807 in Fontainebleau, France between King Charles IV of Spain and the French Emperor Napoleon. Under the treaty, the House of Braganza was to be driven from the Kingdom of Portugal with the country subsequently divided into three regions.  Within seven months the government of Spain had collapsed and two Spanish kings abdicated; in August 1808 Napoleon imposed his brother Joseph as King of Spain.

Negotiated and agreed between Don , plenipotentiary of Charles IV, and Marshal Géraud Duroc as the representative of Napoleon, the accord contained 14 articles along with supplementary provisions relating to troop allocations for the planned invasion of Portugal.

According to historian Charles Oman, it is probable that Napoleon never had any intention of carrying out the treaty's provisions. Aside from his desire to occupy Portugal, his real purpose may have been to surreptitiously introduce a large French force into Spain in order to facilitate its subsequent takeover.

Background
After his attempt to invade Great Britain in 1806 failed, Napoleon decreed a Continental Blockade, which prohibited trade of British products throughout the European continent. Portugal, a traditional ally of England, refused to obey him. In order to invade Portugal, Napoleon required a route for his ground troops through Spain, necessitating a treaty with that country.

Articles

Article 1
The province of Entre-Douro-e-Minho along with the city of Oporto to be ceded to the King of Etruria, with the title King of North Lusitania.

Article 2
Under this section the province of Alentejo, along with the Kingdom of the Algarves were to be given to Manuel Godoy, Prime Minister of Spain and confidant of Charles IV's wife, Maria Luisa of Parma. Godoy, who was known as the Príncipe de la Paz (Prince of Peace), would also receive the title of Prince of the Algarves under the treaty. He was considered an "odious and disgraceful" man, casting doubt on whether Napoleon would have delivered such a prize to a man he described as "a horror of the nation". Instead, in Napoleon's own words, "he [Godoy] is a rascal who will open the gates of Spain for me".

Article 3
Control of the provinces of Beira, Tras-os-Montes and Portuguese Estremadura would remain in abeyance until a general peace occurred, whereupon they would be disposed of according to a further agreement between the treaty parties.

Articles 4, 5, 6 and 7  
The Kingdom of Northern Lusitania would pass to the country's king's descendants according to Spanish inheritance law as would the Principality of the Algarves. In the absence of legitimate heirs of either territory they would revert to the Spanish throne, without ever becoming united under one sovereign. Both entities would remain under the aegis of the Spanish king, and would be unable to make war or agree peace without his consent.

Article 8
In the event that the provinces of Beira, Tras-os-Montes, and Portuguese Extremadura were returned as part of a general peace to the House of Braganza in exchange for Gibraltar, Trinidad, and other colonies captured by the English, the new sovereign of these provinces would be bound to the king of Spain under the same terms as the King of the Northern Lusitania and the Prince of the Algarves detailed above.

Article 9
The King of Etruria would cede his kingdom and all his property to the French Emperor.

Article 10
Once the occupation of Portugal was complete, the different rulers would appoint commissioners to fix the actual borders between them.

Article 11
All Spanish territory south of the Pyrenees would be guaranteed by the French.

Article 12
The King of Spain would receive the title "King of the two Americas" within three years of the treaty.

Article 13
Islands, colonies and other overseas properties of Portugal would be divided between Spain and France.

Article 14
Confirmed that the treaty was secret and required ratification in the Spanish capital, Madrid, no more than 20 days after its signature.

Supplementary terms
The troops to be assembled for the invasion consisted of 25,000 French infantry and 3,000 cavalry. Spain would provide 24,000 infantry, 30 guns and 3,000 cavalry. The Spanish cavalry, artillery and 8,000 infantry would join the French at Alcantara then march to Lisbon. Entre Minho e Douro and Oporto would be occupied by 10,000 Spanish infantry while 6,000 invaded Portuguese Extramadura and the Algarves. To counter any English interference or Portuguese opposition, 40,000 men would assemble at Bayonne.

Aftermath
Junot's army entered Lisbon on 30 November, whereupon the Portuguese royal family departed for Brazil where they would remain until 1821.

In 1808, France would launch a takeover in Spain, triggering the Peninsular War.

See also
 French invasion of Portugal
 Timeline of the Peninsular War

Notes

References

Bibliography

Original text of the Treaty of Fontainebleau, in Spanish "Historia del levantamiento, Guerra y Revolución de España", Count of Toreno (Jose María Queipo de Llano Ruiz de Saravia), Paris, 1838. Google Books.

1807 in Portugal
1807 in France
1807 treaties
Fontainebleau (October 1807)
Fontainebleau
Fontainebleau (October 1807)
Fontainebleau
France–Spain relations